Levet is a commune in the Cher department in the Centre-Val de Loire region of France.

Geography
The A71 autoroute passes through the commune.

Population

Sights
 A sixteenth-century house.
 The church, dating from the nineteenth century.
 A modern chateau of Soulangy.

See also
Communes of the Cher department

References

Communes of Cher (department)